Isaac Asimov's Robot City: Odyssey is a science fiction novel written in 1987 by Michael P. Kube-McDowell. It is part of the series Isaac Asimov's Robot City, inspired by Isaac Asimov's Robot series. The 1995 computer game Robot City is based on the plot of Odyssey.

The book
Derec, a man without a memory, is stranded on an icy asteroid. His only chance for survival is gaining information from a band of mining robots who are searching for a mysterious object known as the "Key to Perihelion".

The story brings to life two scientific concepts that have been used in many space fiction novels since: artificial intelligence and instantaneous space travel.

Plot summary 
A young man awakens in an emergency escape pod finding himself on the surface of an asteroid and having no memory of his identity or how he ended up in this situation. He adopts the name 'Derec' from the name on his space suit, which he later finds out is only the suit's manufacturer. He is soon rescued by a colony of robots who are mining the asteroid in search of something hidden there.  Their mission is surrounded in the utmost secrecy such that Derec is not told what they searching for nor allowed to communicate with the outside world. However, the robots send a message to their commander asking what to do and continue their work.

Derec has limited freedom to explore the subterranean operation and is amazed at the level of engineering design in the robots and their operation. Likewise, he begins to realize that he himself is well trained in robotics, both technically and psychologically (pertaining to the Three Laws of Robotics). Eventually, a passing alien pirate ship receives the robot's signal and attacks the colony. Due to the secrecy of the robot's mission, their orders dictate they must destroy themselves upon discovery. However, doing that would jeopardize Derec's life and thus the robots would be failing to obey the First Law of Robotics.

Derec escapes to the surface of the asteroid using a modified 'augment' (augmented worksuit) and attempts to board the alien ship. While the alien ship bombards the asteroids' surface, the robots below are destroying themselves in the incinerator, but one robot is attempting to "save" Derec. Just before the robot is destroyed by the alien blasters, it finds the object of their search on the surface and bequeaths it to Derec, though Derec knows nothing of its function or importance.  Derec is then captured by the aliens.

On the alien ship, which is a compilation of smaller ships pieced together, he meets its captain, a ruthless humanoid named Aranimas, who is on a mission to procure robots for his own use. He apparently has little knowledge of robotics. In a trade for his life, Derec must build a robot for Aranimas, but is only supplied with random robototic parts that Aranimass has collected through his piracy, including the arm of the destroyed robot who gave Derec the object. Surmising the object's importance, Derec decides he must get it back from Aranimas and escape.

During the construction of the robot, whom he names 'Alpha', Derec discovers and befriends another servant of Aranimass, a small, furry canine-like alien who he names 'Wolruf', since he cannot pronounce the real name. Together, they plan to mutiny against Aranimas with the help of Alpha by taking advantage of the fact that Alpha is bound by the Three Laws of Robotics and Aranimas is ignorant of that fact.  They subdue Aranimas and gain access to the room where the object is hidden.  While looking for it, Derec encounters another prisoner and is surprised to find that she is a human female who apparently knows him. But before she can tell him anything, he trips a booby trap protecting the object and falls unconscious.

Derec awakens in a medical facility on a remote space station that is entirely operated by robots. Beside him is the female, Katherine. Derec is told they were the only two found and is remorseful that Wolruf has been left behind. Anxious to return to society, they learn through the Rockliffe Station manager, an off-station human, that the ship they arrived in (the part of Aranimas's monstrosity in which was the booby trapped room) has been seized to cover the cost of their medical bills and that the next supply ship to take them back to civilization is weeks away.

Wanting to find the object, they venture out into the station looking for the hangar containing their ship. Upon finding the ship in an abandoned section, they discover the robots have removed the object. There they also discover Wolruf, who has been hiding on the station since their arrival and is starving due to the absence of food on a robotic installation. She informs Katherine and Derec that the object they are looking for is called the "Key of Perihelion" and is under heavy robot guard.  It is a highly valuable object, but Aranimas could not get it to work.

Using a First Law farce to draw the guards away from the Key, Derec steals it and escapes into an empty section of the station. Katherine and Wolruf meet him, with robots following close on their heels. Just as the door opens, Derec actives the Key and he and Katherine disappear into thin air, leaving Wolruf behind again with Alpha, who had opened the door.

Katherine and Derec reappear on the top of a pyramid shaped building in the center of an expansive city. They descend the building's surface, hiding the Key in one of the holes they find as they climb down. It is immediately apparent that the city has peculiar properties in that buildings appear and disappear overnight and the entire population is composed of robots. However, the robots had been aware of one other human in the city, and that person had recently been murdered. Because of the First Law, the robots concluded that one or other of the only other humans in the city, Derec and Katherine, must have committed the murder. The story ends with both of them being murder suspects, and the series continues in Isaac Asimov's Robot City: Suspicion.

References

 Isaac Asimov's Robot-Empire-Foundation Series Timeline
 

1987 American novels
1987 science fiction novels
American science fiction novels
Children's science fiction novels